Serebryany Bor (literally "Silver Pinewood") is a large forest park in north-west Moscow. The park is a natural monument of regional significance and a protected area of the city of Moscow. It poses an artificial island that was formed during the creation of the Khoroshevskoye spryamlenie canal ("Khoroshevsky cutoff" canal). Serebryany Bor covers an area of 328.6 hectares.

References

Parks and gardens in Moscow